Alan Smith (born 1966) is a presenter and newsreader on BBC Radio 4, who also appears on sister station Radio 4 Extra. Born in the Simpson Memorial Maternity Pavilion, Edinburgh, Scotland, he moved with his family to Cumbria when he was two.

He joined Radio 4 in 2002 after presenting on regional radio & TV. In addition to his BBC work, he hosts an in-flight entertainment programme for British Airways together with corporate presentations. In 2006/7 he had the unusual experience for a formal  radio announcer, of having his vocals used as a rap on a dance track after UK electronica act The Young Punx sampled him reading the Shipping Forecast for their track "Rockall". Alan Smith has previously read the news for Radio 2.

As of June 2018, Alan Smith reads the news on the Radio 4 flagship Today Programme.

References

Radio and television announcers
BBC Radio 4
BBC Radio 4 Extra
1966 births
Living people